Delvin is a barony in north-east County Westmeath, in the Republic of Ireland. It was formed by 1672. It is bordered by County Meath to the east and three other baronies: Fore (to the north–west), Moyashel and Magheradernon (to the south–west) and Farbill (to the south). The largest centre of population is Delvin.

Geography
The N51, a national secondary road, starts in Delvin at a junction with the N52 and leaves the barony eventually terminating near Drogheda in County Louth. The N52 passes through Delvin, connecting the M1 motorway north of Dundalk in County Louth with the M7 motorway just south of Nenagh, County Tipperary. The R395 regional road links Delvin  to Edgeworthstown in County Longford.

Civil parishes of the barony 
This table lists an historical geographical sub-division of the barony known as the civil parish (not to be confused with an Ecclesiastical parish).

The civil parish of Killucan is split between two baronies, however the majority is within the barony of Farbill.

Towns, villages and townlands
Archerstown
Bracklin
Clonmellon
Delvin
Drumcree

There are 98 townlands in the barony of Delvin.

Buildings of note
Ballinlough Castle
Clonyn Castle
Delvin Castle
Killua Castle

References

External links
Map of Delvin at openstreetmap.org
Barony of Delvin, County Westmeath at Townlands.ie

Baronies of County Westmeath